The Hungarian lexicon (Hungarian "Magyar lexikon"), subtitled the encyclopaedia of all sciences (Hungarian "Az összes tudományok encziklopédiája"), was a general Hungarian lexicon..

History 
The work appeared in Budapest between 1879 and 1885 in 160 booklets, which were later bound into 16 volumes. (There were also 17 volume versions.) The work contained 160 pictorial appendices. Its editor was Ede Somogyi. A I – XIV. published by Frigyes Rautmann. A XV. volume was published by Lajos Gerő's Publishing Office, the 16th was published by Pallas Literary and Printing Company.

The small-shaped (21 cm x 15 cm) volumes have a total volume of about 10,200 pages. The work is now rare in antique offerings. There is no reprint edition.

Order of volumes

Sources 
 Volumes of the "Hungarian lexicon"
 Kiszlingstein Sándor: Magyar könyvészet 1876–1885, Budapest, 1890 
 Antikvarium.hu

External links 
 Digital edition

Hungarian encyclopedias